Stanley Heaberlin (September 4, 1908 – October 2, 1989) was an American politician who served in the Iowa Senate from 1965 to 1969.

References

1908 births
1989 deaths
Democratic Party Iowa state senators
20th-century American politicians